Burns is a crater on Mercury. It has a diameter of 43 kilometers. Its name was adopted by the International Astronomical Union (IAU) in 1985. Burns is named for the Scottish poet Robert Burns, who lived from 1759 to 1796.

To the southeast of Burns is the crater To Ngoc Van, which shows evidence of volcanic activity.

References

Impact craters on Mercury
Robert Burns